Nothodelphax is a genus of delphacid planthoppers in the family Delphacidae. There are more than 20 described species in Nothodelphax.

Species
These 21 species belong to the genus Nothodelphax:

 Nothodelphax albocarinata (Stal, 1858)
 Nothodelphax albocarinatus (Stål, 1858)
 Nothodelphax atlanticus (China, 1958)
 Nothodelphax consimilis (Van Duzee, 1897)
 Nothodelphax distincta (Flor, 1861)
 Nothodelphax distinctus (Flor, 1861)
 Nothodelphax eburneocarinata (Anufriev, 1979)
 Nothodelphax eburneocarinatus (Anufriev, 1979)
 Nothodelphax foveata (Van Duzee, 1897)
 Nothodelphax gillettei (Van Duzee, 1897)
 Nothodelphax glacia Wilson, 1992
 Nothodelphax guentheri (Dlabola, 1966)
 Nothodelphax latifrons Emeljanov, 1982
 Nothodelphax lineatipes (Van Duzee, 1897)
 Nothodelphax neocclusa (Muir & Giffard, 1924)
 Nothodelphax occlusa (Van Duzee, 1897)
 Nothodelphax serrata (Beamer, 1948)
 Nothodelphax slossonae (Ball, 1903)
 Nothodelphax tshaunica (Anufriev, 1979)
 Nothodelphax umbrata Emeljanov, 1982
 Nothodelphax venusta (Beamer, 1948)

References

Further reading

External links

 

Delphacini
Articles created by Qbugbot
Auchenorrhyncha genera